The Jackson Committee was established in 1974 by the Whitlam government of Australia to advise on policies for Australia's manufacturing industry.

The committee was chaired by R.G. Jackson, the then general manager and a director of CSR Ltd. Its report advocated a move towards a more open economy, with gradual structural adjustment of Australia's manufacturing sector. However, it was criticised over its call for increased assistance to manufacturing through grants and tax concessions and its suggestion that exchange-rate policy should offer more support for the sector.

Political history of Australia